Colonel Henry Vaughan Brooke (1743 – 27 November 1807) was an Irish politician.

Background
Brooke originated from a family with roots in the counties Fermanagh as well as Donegal and was the son of Basil Brooke. His mother was Jane, daughter of Henry Wrey. He was educated at Trinity College, Dublin until 1761 and when his father died seven years later, he inherited the latter's estates. Brooke was unmarried and following his death was succeeded by his nephew Thomas Grove, who thereupon assumed his uncle's surname.

Career
Brooke entered the Irish House of Commons in 1776, having been elected for Donegal Borough. In 1783, he stood successfully for both Donegal County as well as Augher, choosing to sit for the former constituency. He represented it until the Act of Union 1801 and then gained a seat in the British House of Commons for the new established constituency Donegal until 1802. By support of his friend Henry Conyngham, 1st Marquess Conyngham, Brooke was returned for Donegal again in 1806, however died only a year later. He was nominated High Sheriff of Donegal in 1786 and became colonel of the county's militia in 1798.

Arms

Notes

References

External links

1743 births
1807 deaths
Alumni of Trinity College Dublin
High Sheriffs of Donegal
Irish MPs 1776–1783
Irish MPs 1783–1790
Irish MPs 1790–1797
Irish MPs 1798–1800
Members of the Parliament of the United Kingdom for County Donegal constituencies (1801–1922)
UK MPs 1801–1802
UK MPs 1806–1807
UK MPs 1807–1812
Members of the Parliament of Ireland (pre-1801) for County Donegal constituencies
Members of the Parliament of Ireland (pre-1801) for County Tyrone constituencies